How Much Love may refer to:

"How Much Love" (Leo Sayer song), a 1977 song by Leo Sayer
"How Much Love" (Survivor song), a 1987 song by Survivor
"How Much Love", a song by Vixen from the album Rev It Up